Archie Alleyne  (January 7, 1933 – June 8, 2015) was a Canadian jazz drummer. Best known as a drummer for influential jazz musicians such as Billie Holiday, Lester Young, Stan Getz, Coleman Hawkins and Ben Webster, he was also prominent as a recording artist on his own and with Canadian jazz musicians such as Oliver Jones, Cy McLean and Brian Browne.

Born and raised in Toronto, Ontario, Alleyne became the house drummer at the Town Tavern jazz club in his 20s.

Following a serious car accident in 1967, Alleyne stepped away from music for a number of years, becoming a partner with Dave Mann, John Henry Jackson and Howard Matthews in  The Underground Railroad, a soul food restaurant in Toronto.

After being bought out of the restaurant in 1981, he returned to music in the early 1980s with Oliver Jones' band.

Alleyne was named to the Order of Canada in 2011. He established the Archie Alleyne Scholarship Fund to provide bursaries to music students, and wrote Colour Me Jazz: The Archie Alleyne Story, an autobiography which was published a few months after his death.

References

External links
Archie Alleyne archives are held at the Clara Thomas Archives and Special Collections, York University Libraries, Toronto, Ontario

1933 births
2015 deaths
Black Canadian musicians
Black Canadian writers
Businesspeople from Toronto
Canadian autobiographers
Canadian jazz drummers
Canadian male drummers
Canadian people of Nigerian descent
Canadian restaurateurs
Canadian male jazz musicians
Members of the Order of Canada
Musicians from Toronto
Writers from Toronto
20th-century Canadian drummers
20th-century Canadian male musicians
20th-century Canadian non-fiction writers
20th-century Canadian male writers